The 1981–82 Alabama Crimson Tide men's basketball team represented the University of Alabama in the 1981–82 NCAA Division I men's basketball season. The team's head coach was Wimp Sanderson, who was in his second season at Alabama. The team played their home games at Coleman Coliseum in Tuscaloosa, Alabama. They finished the season 24–7, 12–6 in SEC play, finishing in third place.

Key freshman signees were guard Ennis Whatley and forward-center Bobby Lee Hurt.

The Tide won the conference tournament championship by winning the SEC tournament, beating the Kentucky Wildcats in the final at Rupp Arena, and won an automatic bid to the 1982 NCAA Division I men's basketball tournament, their first NCAA tournament appearance since 1976.  The Tide defeated St. John's University in the opening round before losing to eventual champion North Carolina.

Roster

References 

Alabama Crimson Tide men's basketball seasons
Alabama
Alabama
1981 in sports in Alabama
1982 in sports in Alabama